Liatris lancifolia is a species of flowering plants in the family Asteraceae native to the prairies of central and western North America, known by the common names lanceleaf blazing star and Great Plains gayfeather.

References

lancifolia
Endemic flora of the United States
Flora without expected TNC conservation status